"7 Skies H3" is a composition by American experimental rock band The Flaming Lips, released on October 31, 2011.

Info
"7 Skies H3" is a single, 24-hour-long song contained in an EP, 24 Hour Song Skull. Although compiled as a contiguous, day-long song, it was recorded in separate pieces ranging anywhere from 25 minutes to 7 hours.

The song was released in a limited edition of 13 copies, on flash drives encased in real human skulls, for Halloween 2011. Each skull cost $5,000. A website was also set up, streaming the song on an endless loop.

On April 19, 2014 the band released a condensed 50 minute version, separated into 10 tracks, on a translucent vinyl LP for Record Store Day, limited to 7,500 copies. It was released on CD and Digital on May 19, 2014.

Track listing

Full version

CD version

Personnel
The Flaming Lips
Wayne Coyne
Michael Ivins
Steven Drozd
Kliph Scurlock
Derek Brown

References

External links
 Download of the song from archive.org

The Flaming Lips songs
Experimental rock songs
2011 songs
Songs written by Wayne Coyne
Songs written by Steven Drozd